Shawn Hlookoff (born September 5, 1984), known as Shawn Hook, is a Canadian singer, songwriter and producer.

Career
Hook studied piano through the Royal Conservatory from as early as age 4. In high school, he played piano and trombone in a jazz combo and jazz big band under the guidance of Rick Lingard. Shawn enrolled in a music composition course at Mount Sentinel Secondary School and started writing and recording his own music.

His first release using his real name Shawn Hlookoff was in 2004 after Colin Davison (a.k.a. Jude Davison, his vocal teacher at Selkirk College Music School) offered to produce it. He also gigged with the disco cover band Shag as a trombone player and back-up vocalist. Enrolling at The Art Institute of Vancouver, he studied audio engineering. He released a second independent 11-track album in 2006 titled Both Sides, also credited as Shawn Hlookoff.

He was the first artist/songwriter to sign to ABC Studios in Los Angeles in 2008. During that time, he made a live appearance on Good Morning America. His compositions were featured on several ABC TV shows including "Life in Faith" on Eli Stone, "She Could Be You" on Kyle XY and "Be Myself" in Greek. His song "Without You" premiered on MTV's series The Hills. His music was also featured in other series like Samurai Girl, General Hospital etc. During his time in Los Angeles, he landed his first acting role as a guest star on the Fox TV show Bones.

Adopting the artistic name Shawn Hook, he released his official debut album Cosmonaut and the Girl produced by Jon Levine on EMI with "So Close", "Every Red Light" and "Two Hearts Set on Fire" as singles from the album. He released a holiday song called "Follow the Lights" in 2012. In 2013, he collaborated with DJ Poet Name Life and Chebacca on a song called "Laser Ray", released on Listen Deep Records. It was his 2014 hit single "Million Ways", released on 2 September 2014, that helped him gain popularity and a following. It became his then most successful charting single on Billboard Canadian Hot 100, giving him three simultaneous hits on the Canadian Hot 100. His highest charting single is "Sound of Your Heart", which has peaked at #23
as of 6 June 2015. "Sound of Your Heart" was featured in promotional commercials for Season 20 of The Bachelor.

On 21 December 2015, it was announced that Hook had signed a deal with major US label Hollywood Records. Hollywood and ABC share the same Parent company, bringing Hook's US Songwriting and Recording contracts together under one deal. In the fall of 2016, Hook joined Lindsey Stirling on her North American tour. In February 2016, he was picked as Elvis Duran's Artist of the Month and was featured on NBC's Today show hosted by Kathy Lee Gifford and Hoda Kotb and broadcast nationally where he performed live his single "Sound of Your Heart". Later in 2016, he opened for Marianas Trench on their North American tour.

In April 2017, Hook released the single "Reminding Me" featuring Vanessa Hudgens. The two star in the music video, which was also released that month. They performed the duet on the season 14 finale of So You Think You Can Dance.

Hook is signed to Kreative Soul Entertainment, Inc. under exclusive license to EMI Music Canada. He has a worldwide deal with Hollywood Records for releases outside of Canada.

Personal life
He grew up in Nelson, British Columbia, Canada with his parents. He established the charity "Feed The Need" with longtime friend Kara Martin, and collected donations for various charities as well as performing at various regional high schools to raise food for the local food bank. Today, he continues with the charity registered and it's been rebranded as "Live To Give".

Discography

Albums

EPs

Singles

Notes

Featured singles

Soundtrack contributions
as Shawn Hlookoff
 2008: Kyle XY - "She Could Be You"
 2008: Eli Stone - "Life in Faith"
 2009: The Hills - "Without You"
 2009: Greek - "Be Myself"
 2009: Bitter/Sweet - "Straight to You"
 2009: The Suite Life on Deck - "Wonderful Surprise"

Awards and nominations

References

External links
 
 

1984 births
Living people
21st-century Canadian male singers
Canadian male singers
Canadian songwriters
Musicians from British Columbia
People from Castlegar, British Columbia
People from Nelson, British Columbia